The Centro de Televisão da Anhanguera, popularly known as CDT da Anhanguera, is the second largest center of television production in Brazil and is the headquarters of the Brazilian TV company SBT. The complex is second only to the Estúdios Globo of TV Globo, located in Rio de Janeiro. The large complex was inaugurated in 1996 by Silvio Santos and it is located in the city of Osasco within the Greater São Paulo metro area. It concentrates all of the activity of SBT in a single facility.

Size 
While the Estúdios Globo of TV Globo has 399 thousand m2, the CDT da Anhanguera studios has 290 thousand m2. This makes the complex the second largest in the country.

Infrastructure 
The CDT da Anhanguera has 11 studios, sewage drainage, an electric power substation, a restaurant, snack bar, bank branch, convenience store, fitness center, internal transportation, medical and dental center, helipad, parking for 700 cars and as well as multi-sport courts.

 Studio 1 (Studio Hebe Camargo) - A Praça É Nossa, Programa Raul Gil, Domingo Legal, Pra Ganhar é Só Rodar.  
 Studio 2 - The Noite and Eliana.
 Studio 3 - Programa Silvio Santos, Roda a Roda, Caldeirão da Sorte and Tele Sena.
 Studio 4 - Programa da Maísa and Esquadrão da Moda.
 Studio 5 - Conexão Repórter.
 Studio 6 - Programa do Ratinho, Casos de Família and Bom Dia & Cia.
 Studio 7 - Carinha de Anjo.
 Studio 8 - Carinha de Anjo.
 Scenographic City - Carinha de Anjo.
 Newsroom - Primeiro Impacto, Fofocalizando, SBT Brasil and Jornal da Semana.

Recording of programs in other places
 Studio S - Base of transport of the SBT and leases for MTV and ESPN.

See also 

 Grupo Silvio Santos
 SBT

References

Sistema Brasileiro de Televisão
1996 establishments in Brazil
Buildings and structures completed in 1996
Television studios